Ubaldo Calabresi (2 January 1925 – 14 June 2004) was an Italian Catholic bishop.

Biography 
Calabresi was born on 2 January 1925 in Sezze Romano, Italy, the fourth of six brothers. He earned degrees in civil and canon law at the Lateran University. He was ordained a priest there on 27 March 1948. 

To prepare for a diplomatic career he entered the Pontifical Ecclesiastical Academy in 1951. 

On 3 July 1969 he was named Titular Bishop of Fundi and Apostolic Delegate to the Red Sea Region. He was consecrated on 28 September 1969 by Vatican Secretary of State Cardinal Jean-Marie Villot. 

He was named Apostolic Nuncio to Venezuela on 5 January 1978.

He was appointed Apostolic Nuncio to Argentina in 1981.

On 27 June 1992 he was a co-consecrator when Jorge Mario Bergoglio, later Pope Francis, was made a bishop.

He was a participant in the successful Vatican mediation between Argentina and Chile over the Beagle conflict.

He retired on 4 March 2000. He suffered from Parkinson's disease and died in Rome on 14 June 2004.

References 

 

 

1925 births
2004 deaths
20th-century Italian Roman Catholic bishops
Apostolic Nuncios to Argentina
Apostolic Nuncios to Sudan
Pontifical Lateran University alumni
Neurological disease deaths in Lazio
Deaths from Parkinson's disease
Apostolic Nuncios to Venezuela